Hokuseihō Osamu (北青鵬 治, born 12 November 2001 as Ariunaagiin Davaaninj is a Mongolian-born Japanese sumo wrestler from the Miyagino stable. He was recruited by the former yokozuna Hakuhō, and is regarded as his protege. He made his professional debut in March 2020 and won his first 21 matches. His highest achieved rank is  maegashira 15.

Career
He was born Ariunaa Davaaninj on 12 November 2001 in Ulaanbaatar, Mongolia. He moved to Sapporo, Hokkaido at the age of five. On his way to a temporary return trip to Mongolia he met yokozuna Hakuhō by chance at an airport in South Korea, who encouraged him to try sumo. From his fourth to sixth year of elementary school he took part in wanpaku sumo competitions, and studied sumo at junior high school in Tottori City. Hokuseihō quit the sumo club after he found the training too intense, but Hakuhō persuaded him to return. After graduating Hokuseihō enrolled at Tottori Jōhoku High School, known for its strong sumo program, again at Hakuhō's recommendation. Previous  attendees of this school are Terunofuji and Ichinojō. He won several high school sumo competitions, and after graduating, he joined Hakuhō at Miyagino stable. Although born in Mongolia, as he had been residing in Japan since five years old, he was able to obtain Japanese nationality and so did not need Miyagino's one foreigner  spot (sumo rules allow for only one foreign-born wrestler per stable).

He listed Hokkaido as his birthplace on the banzuke ranking sheets and was given the shikona of Hokuseihō. His debut was in March 2020, at a tournament with no spectators to due coronavirus restrictions. With the May 2020 tournament being cancelled altogether, his first official tournament with a ranking was in July 2020. In his first three tournaments he won all 21 of his matches, to equal the fifth longest record start to a professional career in sumo history. He won the yūshō or championship in each of the jonokuchi, jonidan and sandanme divisions. He had to sit out the January 2021 tournament, which would have been his debut in the makushita division, due to Hakuhō testing positive for COVID-19 and his whole stable being withdrawn from competition. Upon his return in March 2021 he lost his first bout in professional sumo to Tokisakae to bring his winning streak to an end, but recovered to post a 5–2 record. A 6–1 record in May was followed by a 7–0 yūshō in July which saw him promoted to the jūryō division. He became the fifth wrestler to win championships in every division from jonokuchi to makushita, and the first since Tochiazuma (now Tamanoi Oyakata). He told reporters that he was pleased to have reached jūryō in just six tournaments and while still in his teens, and said that he was aiming for double-digit wins in his first tournament as a sekitori or salaried wrestler. He said he wanted to be a yokozuna by the age of 21, like his mentor Hakuhō.

He was unable to compete in his jūryō debut after he tested positive for COVID-19, which forced the whole of the Miyagino stable to sit out the September 2021 tournament. He kept his rank for the following tournament in November 2021, but was forced to pull out on the second day with a right knee ligament injury. This resulted in his demotion back to makushita.
 On the second day of the July tournament he defeated Chiyosakae, and spoke afterwards of his relief at finally getting his first win as a sekitori in his third tournament ranked in jūryō, and the encouragement of Magaki Oyakata (the former Hakuhō), who he had once again been assigned to as an attendant after dropping to makushita. He finished the tournament with an 11–4 record, the best of his career to date. His promotion was confirmed with the release of the March 2023 banzuke on February 27, and Hokuseihō told reporters he was aiming for promotion to sanyaku within the year. His previously reported height of 200cm was also updated to 204cm, making him the tallest wrestler ever in the top division since offical measurements began in September 1953, alongside Akebono.

Fighting style
At  Hokuseihō is the tallest sekitori, and with his big height advantage he was able to overwhelm most of his early opponents by quickly grabbing their mawashi and forcing them out of the dohyō. He wins most of his matches by yorikiri (force out) and prefers a migi-yotsu (left hand outside, right hand inside) position.

Career record

See also
Glossary of sumo terms
List of active sumo wrestlers

References

External links

2001 births
Living people
Japanese sumo wrestlers
Mongolian sumo wrestlers
Sportspeople from Ulaanbaatar
Sumo people from Hokkaido
Mongolian emigrants to Japan